John Smith (1882 – after 1911) was an English professional footballer who scored 39 goals in 110 appearances in First Division of the Football League playing for Wolverhampton Wanderers and Birmingham. He played as a forward.

Smith was born in Wednesfield, Staffordshire, and played for Cannock and for Stafford Road before joining Wolverhampton Wanderers in 1906. He scored twice on his debut in the Football League on the opening day of the 1902–03 season, in a 3–0 home win against Derby County. He continued to score at a respectable rate, and two seasons later was Wolves' leading scorer jointly with Billy Wooldridge. In April 1906, with Wolves' relegation from the First Division confirmed, Smith joined fellow First Division club Birmingham; they still had three games left to play, in which he contributed one goal. However, as a short, stocky man he did not fit in with Birmingham's style of play, and less than a year later he moved on, to Southern League club Bristol Rovers. In his only season with Rovers he scored 10 goals in 31 Southern League games, and then embarked on a tour of the Southern League, playing in turn for Norwich City, Luton Town, Millwall and Coventry City.

References

1882 births
Year of death missing
People from Wednesfield
English footballers
Association football forwards
Wolverhampton Wanderers F.C. players
Birmingham City F.C. players
Bristol Rovers F.C. players
Norwich City F.C. players
Luton Town F.C. players
Millwall F.C. players
Coventry City F.C. players
English Football League players
Southern Football League players
Date of birth missing
Place of death missing
Stafford Road F.C. players